Brian Campion may refer to:

 Brian Campion (politician) (born 1970), American politician in the Vermont House of Representatives
 Brian Campion (hurler) (born 1984), Irish hurler